In astrophysics, a bow shock occurs when the magnetosphere of an astrophysical object interacts with the nearby flowing ambient plasma such as the solar wind.  For Earth and other magnetized planets, it is the boundary at which the speed of the stellar wind abruptly drops as a result of its approach to the magnetopause. For stars, this boundary is typically the edge of the astrosphere, where the stellar wind meets the interstellar medium.

Description

The defining criterion of a shock wave is that the bulk velocity of the plasma drops from "supersonic" to "subsonic", where the speed of sound cs is defined by

A common complication in astrophysics is the presence of a magnetic field. For instance, the charged particles making up the solar wind follow spiral paths along magnetic field lines. The velocity of each particle as it gyrates around a field line can be treated similarly to a thermal velocity in an ordinary gas, and in an ordinary gas the mean thermal velocity is roughly the speed of sound. At the bow shock, the bulk forward velocity of the wind (which is the component of the velocity parallel to the field lines about which the particles gyrate) drops below the speed at which the particles are gyrating.

Around the Earth
The best-studied example of a bow shock is that occurring where the Sun's wind encounters Earth's magnetopause, although bow shocks occur around all planets, both unmagnetized, such as 
Mars and Venus and magnetized, such as Jupiter or Saturn.

At comets

Bow shocks form at comets as a result of the interaction between the solar wind and the cometary ionosphere. Far away from the Sun, a comet is an icy boulder without an atmosphere. As it approaches the Sun, the heat of the sunlight causes gas to be released from the cometary nucleus, creating an atmosphere called a coma. The coma is partially ionized by the sunlight, and when the solar wind passes through this ion coma, the bow shock appears.

The first observations were made in the 1980s and 90s as several spacecraft flew by comets 21P/Giacobini–Zinner, 1P/Halley, and 26P/Grigg–Skjellerup. It was then found that the bow shocks at comets are wider and more gradual than the sharp planetary bow shocks seen at for example Earth. These observations were all made near perihelion when the bow shocks already were fully developed.

The Rosetta spacecraft followed comet 67P/Churyumov–Gerasimenko from far out in the solar system, at a heliocentric distance of 3.6 AU, in toward perihelion at 1.24 AU, and back out again. This allowed Rosetta to observe the bow shock as it formed when the outgassing increased during the comet's journey toward the Sun. In this early state of development the shock was called the "infant bow shock". The infant bow shock is asymmetric and, relative to the distance to the nucleus, wider than fully developed bow shocks.

Around the Sun

For several decades, the solar wind has been thought to form a bow shock at the edge of the heliosphere, where it collides with the surrounding interstellar medium. Moving away from the Sun, the point where the solar wind flow becomes subsonic is the termination shock, the point where the interstellar medium and solar wind pressures balance is the heliopause, and the point where the flow of the interstellar medium becomes subsonic would be the bow shock. This solar bow shock was thought to lie at a distance around 230 AU from the Sun – more than twice the distance of the termination shock as encountered by the Voyager spacecraft.

However, data obtained in 2012 from NASA's Interstellar Boundary Explorer (IBEX) indicates the lack of any solar bow shock. Along with corroborating results from the Voyager spacecraft, these findings have motivated some theoretical refinements; current thinking is that formation of a bow shock is prevented, at least in the galactic region through which the Sun is passing, by a combination of the strength of the local interstellar magnetic-field and of the relative velocity of the heliosphere.

Around other stars

In 2006, a far infrared bow shock was detected near the AGB star R Hydrae.

Bow shocks are also a common feature in Herbig Haro objects, in which a much stronger collimated outflow of gas and dust from the star interacts with the interstellar medium, producing bright bow shocks that are visible at optical wavelengths.

The Hubble Space Telescope captured these images of bow shocks made of dense gasses and plasma in the Orion Nebula.

Around massive stars 
If a massive star is a runaway star, it can form an infrared bow-shock that is detectable in 24 μm and sometimes in 8μm of the Spitzer Space Telescope or the W3/W4-channels of WISE. In 2016 Kobulnicky et al. did create the largest spitzer/WISE bow-shock catalog to date with 709 bow-shock candidates. To get a larger bow-shock catalog The Milky Way Project (a Citizen Science project) aims to map infrared bow-shocks in the galactic plane. This larger catalog will help to understand the stellar wind of massive stars.

The closest stars with infrared bow-shocks are:

Most of them belong to the Scorpius–Centaurus association and Theta Carinae, which is the brightest star of IC 2602, might also belong to the Lower Centaurus–Crux subgroup. Epsilon Persei does not belong to this stellar association.

Magnetic draping effect
A similar effect, known as the magnetic draping effect, occurs when a super-Alfvenic plasma flow impacts an unmagnetized object such as what happens when the solar wind reaches the ionosphere of Venus: the flow deflects around the object draping the magnetic field along the wake flow.

The condition for the flow to be super-Alfvenic means that the relative velocity between the flow and object, is larger than the local Alfven velocity  which means a large Alfvenic Mach number: . For unmagnetized and electrically conductive objects, the ambient field creates electric currents inside the object, and into the surrounding plasma, such that the flow is deflected and slowed as the time scale of magnetic dissipation is much longer than the time scale of magnetic field advection. The induced currents in turn generate magnetic fields that deflect the flow creating a bow shock. For example, the ionospheres of Mars and Venus provide the conductive environments for the interaction with the solar wind. Without an ionosphere, the flowing magnetized plasma is absorbed by the non-conductive body. The latter occurs, for example, when the solar wind interacts with Moon which has no ionosphere. In magnetic draping, the field lines are wrapped and draped around the leading side of the object creating a narrow sheath which is similar to the bow shocks in the planetary magnetospheres. The concentrated magnetic field increases until the ram pressure becomes comparable to the magnetic pressure in the sheath:

Magnetic draping has been detected around planets, moons, solar coronal mass ejections, and galaxies.

See also
 Shock wave
 Shock waves in astrophysics
 Heliosheath
 Fermi glow
 Bow shock (aerodynamics)

Notes

References

External links

NASA Astronomy Picture of the Day: Zeta Oph: Runaway Star (8 April 2017)
Bow shock image (HD77581)
Bow shock image (LL Ori)
More on the Voyagers
Hear the Jovian bow shock (from the University of Iowa)
Cluster spacecraft makes a shocking discovery (Planetary Bow Shock)

Planetary science
Sun
Shock waves
Waves in plasmas
Concepts in astronomy